The Kingdom of Dalmatia was a crown land of the Austrian Empire (1815–1867) and the Cisleithanian half of Austria-Hungary (1867–1918). It encompassed the entirety of the region of Dalmatia, with its capital at Zadar.

History

The Habsburg monarchy had annexed the lands of Dalmatia after the Napoleonic War of the First Coalition: when Napoleon Bonaparte launched his Italian Campaign into the Habsburg duchies of Milan and Mantua in 1796, culminating in the Siege of Mantua, he compelled Emperor Francis II to make peace. In 1797 the Treaty of Campo Formio was signed, whereby the Habsburg emperor renounced possession of the Austrian Netherlands and officially recognized the independence of the Italian Cisalpine Republic. In turn, Napoleon ceded to him the possessions of the Republic of Venice, including the Dalmatian coast (Venetian Dalmatia) and the Bay of Kotor (Venetian Albania). La Serenissima had sided with Austria in order to defend her Domini di Terraferma and was occupied by French troops on 14 May 1797. The treaty ended the centuries-long history of the Venetian Republic.

The newly acquired Habsburg crown land stretched from the Rab Island and Karlobag in the north down the Adriatic coast to Budva in the south, while the Republic of Ragusa (Dubrovnik) retained its independence until 1808. When in 1804 Francis II created the title of Emperor of Austria for himself (as Francis I), he also added that of "King of Dalmatia" (Dalmatiae Rex). However, the possessions were again lost after the Austrian defeat in the Battle of Austerlitz and the 1805 Peace of Pressburg, when they temporarily formed part of the French Illyrian Provinces. Not until the Congress of Vienna in 1814–15 was the Kingdom of Dalmatia formed from the regained territories, now including the former Republic of Ragusa and stretching down to Sutomore in the southeast.

Around 1850, the Austrians had the Prevlaka fortress erected to control the maritime traffic in the Bay of Kotor. Upon the Revolutions of 1848, Dalmatia was temporarily under the control of Ban Josip Jelačić of Croatia. However, the Italian-speaking elite dominating the Diet of Dalmatia urged autonomy for the kingdom as an Austrian crown land against the Croatian national revival movement's demand for a Triune Kingdom of Croatia, Slavonia, and Dalmatia. In the Austro-Hungarian Compromise of 1867, a unification with the Kingdom of Croatia-Slavonia was denied. While Croatia-Slavonia was incorporated into the Lands of the Crown of Saint Stephen, Dalmatia remained a crown land of the Cislethanian (Austrian) half of the Dual Monarchy.

The kingdom was a separate administrative division of Austria-Hungary until 1918, when its territory except for Zadar and the islands of Lastovo and Palagruza which were annexed by the Kingdom of Italy became part of the State of Slovenes, Croats and Serbs and the Kingdom of Serbs, Croats and Slovenes (later the Kingdom of Yugoslavia). As a result of the Vidovdan Constitution (in 1921), the majority of the kingdom was divided into the Split Oblast and Dubrovnik Oblast, with the Bay of Kotor being administratively split off to the largely Montenegrin Zeta Oblast.

First Austrian Administration
Many workers and citizens throughout Dalmatia were revolted by the fall of the Venetian Republic in 1797. A strong movement for unification of Dalmatia with Kingdom of Croatia-Slavonia emerged. The Franciscans and many other members of the clergy held gatherings, for example in the village of Gornji Karin, where they demanded unification. They were joined by Archbishop Lelije Cipiko of Split, the Bishop of Makarska and the Orthodox clergy. In June 1797, they formed a delegation which planned to travel to Vienna and ask the Emperor to approve unification but they were pre-empted by the Treaty of Campo Formio, so they decided to contact the Croatian Ban instead. By the Treaty of Campo Formio, signed on 18 October 1797 between the French First Republic and the Habsburg monarchy, Venetian territories were divided between the two states with Habsburg Monarchy gaining Istria and Dalmatia.

The Austrian army, with about 4,000 soldiers, was led by the Croatian general Mathias Rukavina von Boynograd in claiming the newly acquired territories. Rukavina, a supporter of the unification of Dalmatia and Croatia-Slavonia, was named Military Governor of Dalmatia. The people and the clergy were delighted to see the arrival of a Croat-led army composed predominantly of ethnic Croats. However, Dalmatia was treated as a newly conquered territory and so it had no autonomous government but was directly subjected to the government in Vienna.

In 1798, the Imperial and Royal Government, headed by the governor, was founded in Zadar. Members of the government and the governor were appointed by the Emperor and were subordinated to the Imperial and Royal Court Committee for Istria, Dalmatia, and Albania in Venice, and since 1802 to the Viennese Royal Chamber's Section for Dalmatia and the Bay of Kotor. Dalmatia was divided into administrative-court districts, headed by the rectors and judge-administrators. Seats of the districts were in Cres, Krk, Rab, Pag, Zadar, Nin, Novigrad, Skradin, Šibenik, Knin, Sinj, Trogir, Split, Klis, Omiš, Brač, Hvar, Korčula, Imotski, Makarska, Poljica and Metković.

In 1802, the Habsburg court officially rejected the request for the unification of Dalmatia with the Kingdom of Croatia-Slavonia. During its short first administration of Dalmatia, the Austrian government did little to change the existing Venetian system and implemented only limited reforms in education and the judiciary. In 1803, a gymnasium was opened in Zadar. After the Austrian defeat against Napoleon, according to the provisions of the 1805 Peace of Pressburg, Dalmatia was handed over to the French, who annexed it to Napoleon's client state of the Kingdom of Italy. That ended the first Austrian administration of Dalmatia.

French Administration
Following the Peace of Pressburg, Napoleon sent General Gabriel Jean Joseph Molitor to take over Dalmatia. In February 1806, the French occupied northern Dalmatia down to the Neretva River. The Bay of Kotor, which was also given to the French by the Peace, was held by the Russians and their Montenegrin allies. In addition, the Russians also occupied the Korčula and sought to capture the Republic of Ragusa.

End of the Republic of Ragusa

According to the provisions of the Peace of Pressburg, France was entitled to all of Dalmatia and the Bay of Kotor. The territory of the Republic of Ragusa (Dubrovnik) cut off terrestrial connection between those French territories. With Napoleon's army on one side, and the weakened Ottoman Empire on other, the Republic was no longer safe. On May 27, 1806, endangered by the Russians, the Republic surrendered without resistance to the French troops. A French force of about 1,200 soldiers under the command of General Jacques Lauriston entered the city under the false pretenses. Since the entry of the French army into Dubrovnik, war operations in the Ottoman Empire, led by the joint Russian military and Montenegrin paramilitary forces, who were assisted by Serb population from the hinterland, began. At the beginning of October 1806, with the help of General Auguste de Marmont, the hostile Russian army was expelled from the territory of the Dubrovnik Republic. Shortly thereafter, the French took over Dubrovnik's government. The needs of a large number of French troops financially exhausted Dubrovnik. Dubrovnik's mercantile navy was destroyed or lost in the Mediterranean ports, and the once very lucrative trade with the hinterland was interrupted. On January 31, 1808, General Marmont, with Napoleon's approval, dissolved Dubrovnik's Senate and abolished Dubrovnik's independence. After the abolition of the Republic, tge Dubrovnik area with Bay of Kotor was subjected to Napoleon's Kingdom of Italy and between 1810 and 1814 included in the French Illyrian Provinces.

Dalmatia under the French

Soon after the occupation of Dalmatia, Napoleon appointed General Vincenzo Dandolo to the position of the provéditeur général of Dalmatia (appointed on April 28, 1806) and General Auguste de Marmont to the position of a military commander of Dalmatia (appointed on June 12, 1806). Dalmatia was administratively linked to the Kingdom of Italy whose seat was in Milan. On October 14, 1809, Illyrian Provinces were created with the Treaty of Schönbrunn. The center of the Dalmatian Government, led by the General Dandolo, was in Zadar. Italian become the official language. Dalmatian interests were advocated (only formally) by the so-called Dalmatian minister without portfolio who worked at the then central government of the Kingdom of Italy in Milan. Ivan Stratico served as a Minister for a long time. Proveditura Generale was divided into six departments (judiciary, internal affairs, finance, military affairs, teaching, accounting) that were led by the department heads. In addition, there were also 1 police and 1 military supervisor. All of them were subordinated to the Secretary-General who was Proveditore Generale's right hand. Main Council of Dalmatians was an advisory body. It was composed of 48 members who were chosen by the Government from the districts, one or more from each, according to the number of districts' inhabitants. The first members were appointed by the Government alone, and after each year 12 of them would resign, after which the Council proposed a list from which the Government would then pick 12 new candidates and appoint them to serve on the Council. The Council was presided over by the Proveditore Generale and it discussed various subjects relevant for Dalmatia. Councils' conclusions were only valid after Proveditore Generale'''s formal confirmation.

The judiciary was separated from the administration. There were 22 local or reconciliatory courts, primarily in all districts, as well as in some other more important areas. Zadar, Split and Dubrovnik were seats of the tribunals which were courts of appeal for local courts and first-instance courts in all civil and criminal cases. Furthermore, a Court of Appeal for Tribunal verdicts was established in Zadar, while the Court in Milan was the Supreme Court. The original intention was to introduce French laws (Napoleonic Code et al.), but it soon became apparent that this would have been unfeasible due to the popular perceptions and customs, especially in property, inheritance and marital affairs. Therefore, in addition to superior French laws, Austrian and Venetian laws were also implied. The equality of all before the law was introduced as well.

Dalmatia was territorially divided into counties, districts, municipalities, and villages. According to such division, Dalmatia was divided into four counties: Zadar, Šibenik, Split and Makarska. Zadar County was divided into six districts (Zadar, Krk, Cres, Lošinj, Rab and Pag), Šibenik County into three (Šibenik, Skradin and Knin), Split County into five (Split, Trogir, Sinj, Nerežišća and Hvar) and Makarska into three (Makarska, Imotski and Korčula). County was led by a commissioner, district by a Vice-commissioner, municipality by a municipal mayor, and village by an elder captain. When the Bay of Kotor was given to France by the 1809 Treaties of Tilsit,  and a year later the Republic of Dubrovnik was abolished, a special Proveditore Generale, Dominik Garagnin, was appointed to rule over four counties (Cavtat, Ston, Lopud and Kotor) and two districts (Herceg Novi and Budva).

The new territorial-administrative system has fundamentally redefined the existing Venetian system in Dalmatia. Some forms of governing bodies from the Venetian period were retained, e.g. the position of the Proveditore Generale and in military terms, the reshuffled institutions of territorial forces. During the French rule in Dalmatia, not much has been done for Dalmatian economic prosperity.
The first feature of the cultural revival of Dalmatia under the French administration was the launch of the bilingual weekly Il Regio Dalmata – Kraglski Dalmatin, whose first issue came out on July 12, 1806. Particular attention was devoted to education, as there were virtually no schools in Dalmatia when General Dandolo first arrived. French sought to build road connections with northern Croatia, and partly with Bosnia and Herzegovina. Construction of new roads was probably followed by military-strategic interests (with respect to the maritime blockade of the Adriatic by England and Russia), but they were also used for economic purposes. Many Dalmatians, especially lower clergymen with the Franciscans at their forehead, hated the French administration, seeing in them "atheists and Jacobins" because the French revoked numerous privileges of some Dalmatian municipalities and corporations trying to modernize Dalmatia.

Second Austrian Administration

Already in 1811, the British took over Vis from French, and in 1812 Lastovo, Korčula, Pelješac, Hvar, Cavtat, Dubrovnik islands and Split. Kotor was held by the Russians. After Napoleon's defeat in the 1813 Battle of Leipzig, the Austrian Empire took control of the Illyrian provinces. The takeover of Dalmatia was easily accomplished in the fall of 1813 by General Franjo Tomašić and his troops of 2,900 Croatian soldiers, because the people of Dalmatia, under the leadership of the clergy, especially the Franciscans, met them as liberators. After the surrender of Zadar (December 6), General Todor Milutinović went on a military campaign to take over Dubrovnik (succeeding on January 27, 1814) and Bay of Kotor, which he did by June 1814. Thus, territory stretching from Zrmanja river to the town of Budva was again subordinated to Vienna. This was confirmed at the 1815 Congress of Vienna.

Baron Tomašić was appointed new Governor of Dalmatia, while the administration was taken over by the newly formed Provincial Government which was led by Tomašić himself. In order to integrate the area between Rab and Budva, the Viennese court has established a special territorial unit - Kingdom of Dalmatia. With the same intent, Pope Leo XII issued papal bull Locum Beati Petri by which he founded unified Zadar metropolis which was superior to all Dalmatian dioceses, including historical Archdioceses of Split and Dubrovnik.  In the period between 1816 and 1822, all new bodies of central and provincial government were founded in Zadar. The judicial reorganization was carried out as well. These administrative and judicial bodies worked until 1852/1854 and some until 1868, when the whole administration was reformed, when new judicial organs and provincial governing bodies were established. Such organization, with minor changes, remained in force until 1918. By the provisions of the 1861 February Patent, Diet of Dalmatia was founded. Austrians were bringing foreign civil servants to Dalmatia, mostly from Austria and northern Italy (then part of the Monarchy). In 1832, a new road that went through Velebit's Mali Alan mountain pass was opened. It was the only connection between Dalmatia and continental Croatia. The Austrian government increased the number of schools; by 1839 there were 50, and by 1846 around 150, attended by a third of school children. Croatian language in schools was almost an exception in comparison to Italian.

Croatian National Revival in Dalmatia
French and Austrian rule greatly contributed to Croatian national awakening in Dalmatia, which was also influenced by the ideas of the Illyrian movement, active in the Kingdom of Croatia. In 1835, Božidar Petranović began printing Serbo-Dalmatian Magazine in Zadar, while in 1844 Ante Kuzmanić launched Zora dalmatinska magazine and began working on the linguistic and national awareness of the Dalmatians, which was until then only encouraged by the clergy. Revolutionary 1848 initially created political division between the markists, who wanted to rebuild the Republic of St. Mark, and the monarchists, proponents of the Habsburg monarchy. As wealthy Italians had full control over cities and their assemblies due to the electoral system, proposals of the Croatian Kingdom's county and city assemblies to the "Dalmatian brothers of the same blood and language" for the unification of Dalmatia and Croatia, were rejected. Nevertheless, Croatian national movement was very strong. In response to the Autonomist Party's refusal to accept unification, vicars and inhabitants of the Dalmatian Hinterland sent a letter to the Croatian ban Josip Jelačić in which they stated that they were still seeking unification and that its opponents were in the great minority. In December 1848, Emperor Franz Joseph I appointed Jelačić Governor of Dalmatia. His appointment was opposed by the Split and Zadar municipalities (both governed by the Autonomist Party), while Croats, especially those in Dubrovnik, met Jelačić with great expectations that were later mostly not fulfilled. Jelačić's role remained largely ceremonial, and the Viennese court refused any discussion on the matter of unification. In 1851, ban Jelačić visited Kingdom, and was welcomed with special enthusiasm in Dobrota. In order to counter the opponents of unification (Italians in particular), Croats were establishing public libraries and cultural societies throughout Dalmatia, mostly under the "Slavic" name. Eventually, Government made the decision by which the Croatian language was taught as a second language in Dalmatian schools. However, there weren't many schools in which the Croatian language was being taught so that's why the Franciscans founded first Croatian gymnasium in 1854 in Sinj.

Conflict between People's and Autonomist parties

In 1860, Emperor Franz Joseph I decided to renew the Empire's constitutional and political life so he convened an expanded Imperial Council. Representatives of the Kingdom of Croatia-Slavonia, Ambroz Vranyczany and Josip Juraj Strossmayer, raised the question of the unification of the Kingdoms of Croatia-Slavonia and Dalmatia. A representative of Dalmatia, Frane Borelli, stated that the Italians were indeed a minority in Dalmatia, but that he didn't believe it was the right time for unification. At the time, there were two opposing political parties in Dalmatia: Croatian nationalist liberal People's Party, led by Miho Klaić and Mihovil Pavlinović, and Italian nationalist conservative Autonomist Party, led by Antonio Bajamonti and Luigi Lapenno. Autonomist Party was supported by the Dalmatian Governor Lazar Mamula, the cities of Zadar and Split, some other smaller cities and municipalities, as well as the Viennese court that feared the weakening of Austria in relation to Croatia-Slavonia and Hungary if the unification happened. People's Party was supported by Stari Grad, Vrboska, Metković, Bol, Dubrovnik and Kotor. The main point of People's Party program was the unification of Dalmatia with Croatia-Slavonia and the introduction of Croatian language in the administration and education.

On the occasion of the convocation of the Ban's Conference in Zagreb in 1860, representatives from Dalmatia were invited to discuss unification, but the Autonomist Party, supported by Ante Mamula, obstructed initiative. Diet of Dalmatia was first convened in 1861. Autonomist Party held the majority of seats due to the unfair electoral system by which large landowners, clerks, and representatives of wealthy citizens, although accounting for only around 20% of the Dalmatian population, had a significant advantage. Diet refused unification of Dalmatia with Croatia-Slavonia. The Austro-Prussian War and Third Italian War of Independence resulted in the 1866 maritime Battle of Vis. After the Austro-Hungarian Compromise of 1867, which strengthened the division and unveiled the prospect of unification of Dalmatia with Croatia-Slavonia to a minimum, the People's Party returned to the political and cultural struggle to croatize Dalmatia, especially focusing on schools, wanting to introduce Croatian as a teaching language. Therefore, their aim was to win power in the municipalities, since the school curriculums were within the municipal scope. In 1862, they launched a weekly in Italian Il Nazionale in order to win over voters whose primary language was Italian. They later started publishing weekly in Croatian Narodni list as well. In 1869, Mihovil Pavlinović wrote Croatian political program -Hrvatska misao, in which he advocated the Croatian right to independence and the establishment of unified and constitutional Croatian state that would have included all "historical Croatian territories", including Dalmatia.

In October 1869, an armed revolt known as the Krivošije uprising occurred in the Bay of Kotor hinterland region of Krivošije. The uprising broke out after a decisive Prussian victory over the Austrian Empire in the 1866 Battle of Königgrätz, and the consequent introduction of mandatory conscription for the people from that region who were by then traditionally exempt from conscription. Due to conscription, sailors lost essential years they could have used for working at sea. People that lived in the mountains were disarmed so they lost the opportunity to go to Herzegovina to hunt small and large cattle. The formal peace accord, by which the conscription was abandoned, and people allowed to retain their weapons, was signed on 11 January 1870.

Members of the People's and Autonomist parties were increasingly clashing as tensions began to rise. On July 31, 1869, during the visit of the Italian ship on a hydrographic mission, a clash between Italian sailors and Croatian citizens of Šibenik broke out. 14 Italian sailors and a few Croats were seriously injured. This clash turned into a diplomatic conflict between the Kingdom of Italy and Austria-Hungary, known as the Monzambano Affair. In the meantime, the People's Party started getting better organized and slowly winning rural municipalities in the Dalmatian Hinterland and on the islands, which culminated in the 1870 election,  when it won the majority of seats in the Diet. On February 15, 1873, the Party won the first major city - Šibenik, where Ante Šupuk was elected mayor. In 1882, despite intimidation and violence by the Autonomist Party's paramilitary units, the People's Party Gajo Bulat defeated the Autonomist Party's Antonio Bajamonti, thus becoming the Mayor of Split. Shortly thereafter, the People's Party won the election in the Stari Grad and Trogir municipalities, while the Autonomist Party only governed Zadar. In 1883, Croatian was proclaimed the official language of the Diet of Dalmatia.

At the same time, the network of Croatian schools grew. In 1866, the Croatian Teachers' School was opened in Arbanasi near Zadar. In 1883, there were about 300 primary, and 3 high schools (in Dubrovnik, Kotor and Split) in which the Croatian language was thought. In 1898, Croatian gymnasium was opened in Zadar.

Serbo-Croatian split

Ever since Vuk Karadžić, Ilija Garašanin and Jovan Subotić started writing about Dalmatia as a Serbian land, and following the recognition of the Kingdom of Serbia as an independent state at the 1878 Congress of Berlin, the different interests of Croats and Serbs in Dalmatia became more evident. Serbs continuously started mentioning Dalmatia as a "Serbian land". After Croatia's enthusiasm with the Austro-Hungarian occupation of Bosnia and Herzegovina, which involved numerous Croatian soldiers from Dalmatia, many of whom had died, and the request for the unification of Bosnia-Herzegovina with Croatia-Slavonia, the conflict was inevitable. In 1879, Serbs from Bukovica voted for the Italian candidate of the Autonomist Party, instead of People's Party Mihovil Klaić. The People's Party called this the Bukovica betrayal. Shortly afterward, separate Croatian and Serbian parties were founded, but Croats still held a majority in the Diet of Dalmatia.

In November 1881, Serbs and Montenegrins that lived in the hinterland of the Bay of Kotor, on the territory of the Kingdom of Dalmatia, rebelled against the mandatory conscription, which was the obligation of all citizens of the Monarchy. The Austrian army, headed by field marshal Stjepan Jovanović, suppressed this rebellion in May 1882.

In 1891, Frano Supilo started publishing Crvena Hrvatska, the journal in which he was writing against Serbian pretensions on Dalmatia and in favor of the unification of Dalmatia with Croatia. In 1893, on the occasion of the erection of a monument dedicated to Ivan Gundulić in Dubrovnik, there were great tensions between Croats and Serbs. Namely, many Croatian dignitaries, politicians, and artists came to Dubrovnik so the festivity turned into an exhibition of Croatian nationalism when people started chanting for Croatia, as opposed to the wishes of some of the people of Dubrovnik who were proponents of Serbian ideas, like Medo Pucić.

With the affirmation of the so-called New Direction Policy, Serbo-Croatian relations started getting better. This was confirmed by the signing of the Zadar Resolution on 25 February 1907. Dr. Lovro Monti stated: "With Serbs, we can do a lot, without Serbs a little, and against Serbs nothing." In 1905, for the first time, a native of Dalmatia, Niko Nardelli (NS), was appointed Governor. In 1912, Italian was abolished in public offices and courts. However, the Austrian government still used Italian and German in its official correspondence.

First World War

Immediately upon the outbreak of the First World War, all organizations that the government considered close to Serbia or to the idea of the creation of a single state for all South Slavic peoples were forbidden. Many prominent politicians were persecuted and arrested while some emigrated. Until 1915, when the Kingdom of Italy joined the Entente Powers after the Treaty of London, there were no war operations on the Adriatic, but since then the maritime conflicts became frequent. Due to the Allied blockade of the Strait of Otranto, trade in the Adriatic almost completely stopped. The government recruited many ships for military purposes, while the civilian sailing has been almost completely suspended. Mandatory blackouts were imposed on the islands and in the ports due to the fear of bombing. A number of church bells were removed, melted and used for war purposes. Fighting was also taking place around Lastovo and the distant islands so artillery batteries were placed there. In 1917, French Air Force bombed Lastovo.

In Dalmatia, hunger and scarcity began to emerge, while at the same time Hungarian laws banned the export of foodstuff to the Austrian half of the Monarchy (which Dalmatia was part of) in the case of war. Dalmatia received food aid through the port of Trieste, but the amounts were inadequate, sometimes even completely useless, and often arriving too late (for example, supplies intended for 1917 arrived in 1918). Therefore, Franciscans and benefactors from Zagreb organized the action of sending Dalmatian children to Slavonia and Moslavina so they could have adequate nutrition. The war destroyed Dalmatian agriculture. At the end of the war, epidemics of the typhus, cholera, smallpox and Spanish influenza broke out, causing the death of many people.

In 1915, Croats made up 34% of Austro-Hungarian Navy personnel. Apart from the Navy, Dalmatians also fought in land units, namely in the 22nd Imperial Regiment, 23rd Zadar Imperial Home Guard Regiment, 37th Dubrovnik Imperial Regiment and the Dalmatian Mounted Rifles. Following the Italian announcement of war, Croats were mostly sent to fight on fronts against Italy because the government expected them to be motivated to fight against those who mistreated them in the past.

As the war ceased, there were also cases of defection, and in February 1918 the rebellion of sailors in the Bay of Kotor broke out. In 1917, representatives of Dalmatia in Imperial Council headed by Vjekoslav Spinčić, Josip Smodlak and Ivo Prodan, wrote the May Declaration, in which they presented a program of unification of all South Slavs within the Austria-Hungary that had to be divided into three equal parts - Austria, Hungary, and Croatia. At the end of the war, the National Council for Dalmatia was founded in Zadar and the unified National Organization for Dalmatia in Split. These bodies soon started to independently govern Dalmatia. In the last days of the Monarchy, General Stjepan Sarkotić managed to convince Hungarian Prime Minister Sándor Wekerle and Emperor Charles I. to support the unification of Dalmatia with Croatia, but that didn't happen until the collapse of the Monarchy in 1918. On October 29, 1918, when the Austro-Hungarian Parliament dismantled, the Croatian Parliament passed a decision by which Croatia-Slavonia terminated state-law relations with Austria-Hungary and, together with Dalmatia and town of Rijeka, joined State of Slovenes, Croats and Serbs.

Demographic history

1818–1857
According to M. Lorković, the total population of Dalmatia numbered 297,912 in 1818; 326,739 in 1825; 338,599 in 1830; 390,381 in 1840; and 393,715 in 1850.

Based on the 1857 census, the Kingdom of Dalmatia had 415,628 inhabitants. According to an analysis of the 1857 census, 318,500 (76.5%) inhabitants were Croats, 77,500 (18.5%) were Serbs, and ca. 20,000 were Italian-speakers (5%). The percentage of Dalmatian Serbs had been 19.9% in the 1830–50 period. In the cities, the inhabitants were 71% Croat, 22% Italian and 7% Serb. There were 745 Serbs in Kotor; in all other cities there were fewer than 400. The number of Serbs in Dalmatia fell; however, in the north it rose. Among the Orthodox, there was one priest for every 400 people, while among the Catholics, there was one priest for every 330 people.

1880
The 1880 Austrian census, recorded the following ethnic groups in the Kingdom:

 371,565 Croats
 78,714 Serbs
 27,305 Italians

1900
The 1900 Austrian census:
Religion
 496,966 Catholics
 96,279 Eastern Orthodox
 539 Others

Language
 Serbo-Croatian: 565,276 (95,2%) 
 Italian: 15,279 (2,6%)
 German: 2,306 (0,4%)
 Total: 593,784

1910
According to the official 1910 Austrian census, population by religion and mother language was:
Religion
 539,057 Catholics
 105,332 Orthodox
 1,257 Others
Language
 Serbo-Croatian: 610,649
 Italian: 18,028 
 German: 3,081 
 Others: 3,077

Cities
The major cities were (1900):

 Zadar, the capital, with 13,016 inhabitants
 Split (18,547)
 Šibenik (10,072)
 Dubrovnik (8,437)

Administrative subdivisions

From 1822 to 1868 the Kingdom of Dalmatia was administratively divided into four circles (counties, Italian: circoli or capitanati circolari, Croatian: okruzi or okružna poglavarstva) - Zadar, Split, Dubrovnik and Kotor - these were subdivided into smaller districts (Italian: distretti-preture, Croatian: kotari-preture), each comprised municipalities (Italian: comuni, Croatian: općine). In 1868 the circles were abolished and Dalmatia was divided into 13 larger (administrative) districts (Italian: distretti politici or capitanati distrettuali, Croatian: kotari or kotarska poglavarstva) whose capitals were (1880):

 Benkovac
 Dubrovnik
 Hvar
 Imotski
 Knin
 Korčula
 Kotor
 Makarska
 Metković
 Sinj
 Split
 Šibenik
 Zadar

Districts, as governmental units with the government-appointed prefect (Italian: capitano distrettuale, Croatian: kotarski poglavar), were subdivided into judicial districts (Italian: distretti giudiziari, Croatian: sudski kotari) and these into municipalities (Italian: comuni, Croatian: općine) as local authorities with the elected municipal council (Italian: consiglio comunale, Croatian: općinsko vijeće)
and the mayor (Italian: podestà, Croatian: načelnik) elected by the council.

Religion
The Roman Catholic archbishop had his seat in Zadar, while the diocese of Kotor, diocese of Hvar, diocese of Dubrovnik, diocese of Šibenik and diocese of Split were bishoprics. At the head of the Orthodox community stood the bishop of Zadar.

The use of Croatian-Slavonic liturgies written in the Glagolitic alphabet, a very ancient privilege of the Roman Catholics in Dalmatia and Croatia, caused much controversy during the first years of the 20th century. There was considerable danger that the Latin liturgies would be altogether superseded by the Glagolitic, especially among the northern islands and in rural communes, where the Slavonic element is all-powerful. In 1904, the Vatican forbade the use of Glagolitic at the festival of SS. Cyril and Methodius, as likely to impair the unity of Catholicism. A few years previously the Slavonic archbishop Rajcevic of Zara, in discussing the "Glagolitic controversy", had denounced the movement as "an innovation introduced by Panslavism to make it easy for the Catholic clergy, after any great revolution in the Balkan States, to break with Latin Rome."

Governors

Head of the Austrian imperial administration in Dalmatia was Imperial-Royal Provincial Governor (Italian: I. R.  Governatore Provinciale, Croatian: c. k. Guverner) appointed by the emperor. From 1852 he was known as Imperial-Royal Lieutenant (Italian: I. R. Luogotenente, Croatian: c. k. Namjesnik'').
 Franjo Tomašić (1815–1831)
 Wenzeslau Lilienberg Water (1831–1841)
 Ivan August Turszky (1841–1848)
 Ludwig von Welden (1848)
 Josip Jelačić (1848–1859)
 Lazar Mamula (1859–1865)
 Franjo Filipović (1865–1868)
 Johann Wagner (1868–1869)
 Gottfried Auersperg (1869)
 Julius Fluk von Leidenkron (1869–1870)
 Gavrilo Rodić (1870–1881)
 Stjepan Jovanović (1882–1885)
 Ludovik Cornaro (1885–1886)
 Dragutin Blažeković (1886–1890)
 Emil David (1890–1902)
 Erasmus Handel (1902–1905)
 Nicola Nardelli (1905–1911)
 Mario Attems (1911–1918)

Military
Military units in the kingdom at the start of the First World War:

 Common Army
 22nd (Dalmatian) Infantry Regiment "Graf von Lacy" (garrison: Spalato/Split)
 Imperial-Royal Landwehr
 Imperial-Royal Mounted Dalmatian State Rifle Division (garrison: Sinj)
 23rd Imperial-Royal Landwehr Infantry Regiment (garrison: Zara/Zadar)
 37th Imperial-Royal Landwehr Infantry Regiment (garrison: Gravosa/Gruž)

Politics

Dalmatian Parliament
The Kingdom of Dalmatia held elections to the Parliament of Dalmatia in 1861, 1864, 1867, 1870, 1876, 1883, 1889, 1895, 1901, 1908.

Reichsrat
 1907

In the 1907 elections, Dalmatia elected the following representatives to the lower chamber of the Reichsrat (Imperial Council)

 Croatian Party
 Ante Dulibić
 Vicko Ivčević
 Frane Ivanišević
 Ante Tresić Pavičić
 Ante Vuković
 Juraj Biankini
 Party of Rights
 Ivo Prodan
 Josip Virgil Perić
 Serb People's Party
 Dušan Baljak
 Miho Bjeladinović
 Independent
 Frane Bulić

 1911

In the 1911 elections, Dalmatia elected the following representatives:

 Croatian Party
 Vicko Ivčević
 Pero Čingrija
 Ante Tresić Pavičić
 Juraj Biankini
 Party of Rights
 Ivo Prodan
 Ante Dulibić
 Ante Sesardić
 Josip Virgil Perić
 Serb People's Party
 Dušan Baljak
 Gjuro Vukotić
 Croatian Popular Progressive Party
 Josip Smodlaka

See also

 Dalmatia
 History of Croatia
 History of Dalmatia
 Kingdom of Croatia (Habsburg)
 Kingdom of Hungary (Habsburg)
 Kingdom of Croatia-Slavonia
 Timeline of Croatian history
 Diet of Dalmatia

Literature

References

External links

 
 German protectorate

 
Dalmatia
Dalm
History of Dalmatia
Former countries in the Balkans
Dalmatia
Former Italian-speaking countries
1918 disestablishments in Europe
States and territories established in 1815
States and territories disestablished in 1918